Opala is a stratovolcano located in the southern part of the Kamchatka Peninsula, Russia.

Recent eruption history
There is no real evidence of recent eruptions that have been found at the slopes of the volcano.

See also
 List of volcanoes in Russia
 List of ultras of Northeast Asia

References

External links
 
 Institute of Volcanology and Seismology: Opala volcano

Further reading
 

Mountains of the Kamchatka Peninsula
Volcanoes of the Kamchatka Peninsula
Stratovolcanoes of Russia
Pleistocene stratovolcanoes
Holocene stratovolcanoes